Sir Leslie Fielding  (29 July 1932 – 4 March 2021) was a British diplomat. In the Diplomatic Service, he spent time in the Foreign Office in London before serving as the European Commission Ambassador to Tokyo between 1978 and 1982. He was Director-General for external relations at the European Commission from 1982 to 1987.

Early life
Fielding was the son of Percy Fielding and Margaret Calder. He was educated at Emmanuel College, Cambridge and the School of Oriental and African Studies, where he studied Persian.

Career
Fielding spent seven years in the Foreign Office in London, as well as serving political assignments in overseas embassies in Tehran, Singapore, Phnom Penh and Paris. He joined the European Commission in 1973 and was the Ambassador to Tokyo between 1978 and 1982. Upon his return from Japan, he became the Director-General for external relations at the European Commission. Fielding was knighted in 1988. He was a non-executive director of IBM (Europe) and a special adviser to Panasonic. Between 1987 and 1992 he was Vice-Chancellor of the University of Sussex.

He was a patron of the Society of King Charles the Martyr.

Death
Sir Leslie died on 4 March 2021 after a short illness.

Publications
Europe as a global partner: the external relations of the European Community, University Association for Contemporary European Studies, London, 1989. 
Before the Killing Fields: Witness to Cambodia and the Vietnam War, I.B.Tauris, 2007. 
"Kindly call me God": the misadventures of 'Fielding of the FO', Eurocrat extraordinaire and vice-chancellor semipotentiary, Boermans Books, 2009. 
Twilight over the Temples: the close of Cambodia's Belle Epoque, Boermans Books, 2011. 
The Mistress of the Bees: a novel, Boermans Books, 2011. 
Mentioned in despatches: Phnom Penh, Paris, Tokyo, Brussels: is diplomacy dead?, Boermans Books, 2012. 
Is Diplomacy Dead? Boermans Books, 2014. 
When The EU Going Was Good Boermans Books, 2020

References
FIELDING, Sir Leslie, Who's Who 2014, A & C Black, 2014; online edn, Oxford University Press, Dec 2013 

1932 births
2021 deaths
People educated at Queen Elizabeth's Grammar School for Boys
Alumni of Emmanuel College, Cambridge
Alumni of SOAS University of London
British diplomats
Ambassadors of the European Union to Japan
Knights Commander of the Order of St Michael and St George
Recipients of the Grand Decoration with Star for Services to the Republic of Austria
People associated with the University of Sussex
IBM employees
British writers
British officials of the European Union